Paki (also, Paiki and Pake) is a former Maidu settlement in Butte County, California, United States. It was located on Mud Creek near Cusa Lagoon; its precise location is unknown.

References

Former settlements in Butte County, California
Former Native American populated places in California
Lost Native American populated places in the United States
Maidu villages